The Billboard Latin Music Award for Streaming Song of the Year is an honor presented annually at the Billboard Latin Music Awards, a ceremony which honors "the most popular albums, songs, and performers in Latin music, as determined by the actual sales, radio airplay, online streaming and social data that informs Billboards weekly charts." The award is given to the best performing singles on Billboards Latin Streaming Songs chart, which measures the most streamed Spanish-language recordings "on leading online music services" in the United States. The list was established by the magazine on April 20, 2013.

Nicky Jam is the most awarded act in the category with three wins from four nominations. Only Enrique Iglesias and Nicky Jam have won twice in a row. Romeo Santos is the most nominated artist without a win, with six. As of 2019, the holders are Casper Mágico, Nio García, Darell, Nicky Jam, Ozuna, and Bad Bunny for the song "Te Boté".

Recipients

Records

Most nominations

Most awards

References

Awards established in 2013
Billboard Latin Music Awards
Song awards
2013 establishments in the United States